The Latin Grammy Award for Best Rock Album by a Duo or Group with Vocal was an honor presented annually by the Latin Academy of Recording Arts & Sciences. It was given at the Latin Grammy Awards, a ceremony that recognizes excellence and promotes a wider awareness of cultural diversity and contributions of Latin recording artists in the United States and overseas. According to the category description guide for the 2009 Latin Grammy Awards, the award was given to vocal rock, hard rock or metal albums containing at least 51 percent of newly recorded material. It was given to duos or groups. The award was last presented at the 2009 Latin Grammy Awards, being replaced in 2010 with the Best Rock Album award.

The accolade for Best Rock Album by a Duo or Group with Vocal was first presented to the Colombian group Aterciopelados at the 2nd Latin Grammy Awards in 2001 for their album Gozo Poderoso. Mexican ensembles have received the award more times than any other nationality, though award-winning albums have also been performed by musicians originating from Chile, Colombia and Panama. Molotov and La Ley has won the most awards in the category, with two wins each. Natalia y La Forquetina, the short-lived band of Mexican singer-songwriter Natalia Lafourcade, is the only band led by a woman to be awarded. Spanish band Jarabe de Palo is the most nominated ensemble without a win, with three unsuccessful attempts.

Recipients

Notes
 Each year is linked to the article about the Latin Grammy Awards held that year
 The nationality of the performing artist(s)
 The name of the performer and the nominated album

See also
 Grammy Award for Best Rock Album

References

General
  Note: User must select the "Rock Field" category as the genre under the search feature.

Specific

External links

 
Awards disestablished in 2009
Awards established in 2001
Rock Album by a Duo or Group with Vocal